Playmate of the Year is the third studio album released by American punk rock band Zebrahead, it is also their final album released via Columbia Records.

The woman modelling on the album cover is American model and actress Jodi Ann Paterson who was a Playboy Playmate in 1999 and named Playmate of the Year in 2000, of which the album refers to.

Singles
"Deck the Halls (I Hate Christmas)" - released as a festive single during the Christmas season of 1999 and received airplay from many radio stations in the U.S and Japan.
"Playmate of the Year" - the title track of the album was released as the lead single in the summer of 2000 and received radio airplay worldwide, a music video accompanied its release in censored and uncensored versions. The video is also available as one of the extras on the Playboy 2001 Video Playmate Calendar.

In the beginning of the video the band wakes up in their apartment from the doorbell of a crowd of women with which the musicians later have fun. At the end of the video Justin Mauriello wakes up again, realizing that it was just a dream, then he opens the door to the postman, that gives him the new issue of journal "Playboy".

"Now or Never" - released exclusively as a radio-only single in Japan in 2001.

Track listing

Notes
The actual song from the track "In My Room" is 3:32 long, before being followed by about a minute of Reel Big Fish band member Tavis Werts playing the digeridoo, followed by about five minutes of silence. At 8:41, a prank call to Sony BMG is played, the call is made by band member Justin Mauriello impersonating his mother, demanding to know when the band is going to "start seeing some money" from their record label.

Personnel
Zebrahead
Ali Tabatabaee – lead vocals
Justin Mauriello – lead vocals, rhythm guitar
Greg Bergdorf – lead guitar
Ben Osmundson – bass guitar
Ed Udhus – drums

Backing staff
Howard Benson – keyboards
Chris Lord-Alge – mixing
Bobby Brooks – engineer
Ernie Vigil; Mat Silva – assistant engineers
Gavin Lurssen – mastering

Chart positions

References

Zebrahead albums
2000 albums
Columbia Records albums
Albums produced by Howard Benson